Turkey has a state-owned railway system built to standard gauge which falls under the remit of the Ministry of Transportation and Infrastructure. The primary rail carrier is the Türkiye Cumhuriyeti Devlet Demiryolları (TCDD) (Turkish State Railways) which is responsible for all long-distance and cross-border freight and passenger trains. A number of other companies operate suburban passenger trains in urban conurbations.

Native railway industry extends to the production of locomotives, passenger vehicles and freight wagons; some vehicles are also produced through licensing agreements and cooperation with foreign countries.

In the early 21st century, major infrastructural projects were realized; such as the construction of a high-speed railway network as well as a tunnel under the Bosphorus strait which connects Europe and Anatolia by rail for the first time.

Turkey is a member of the International Union of Railways (UIC). The UIC Country Code for Turkey is 75.

History

Construction of the first railway line in Turkey began in 1856, being constructed by a British company that had gained permission from the Ottoman Empire. Later, French and German companies also constructed lines – the motivation was not only economic, the region had a strategically important position as a trade route between Europe and Asia.

Railways were constructed serving mines, agriculture, people and ports; at the same time more lines serving eastern Anatolia were built, in their part helping to tie Turkey together as a functioning state.

In the years following World War II, the emphasis in transportation shifted to asphalt road and highway construction; it was not until the end of the 20th century that railways returned to favour with major passenger infrastructure projects being initiated, and five thousand kilometres of new lines planned for construction.

The Central Treaty Organisation, dissolved after the Iranian Revolution, sponsored some railway building with British money. A railway line, some of which was completed, was built to enable a rail connexion between London and Tehran via Van. A section from Lake Van in Turkey to Sharafkhaneh in Iran was completed and funded in large part by CENTO (mainly the UK). The civil engineering was especially challenging because of the difficult terrain. Part of the route included a rail ferry across Lake Van with a terminal at Tatvan on the Western side of the lake.

Future restructuring and plans
The Turkish State Railways (TCDD) may be split with the passenger and freight operations being part of a new company named DETAŞ (Demiryolu Taşımacılığı Anonim Şirketi, meaning Railway Transport Company) with TCDD left as a track and infrastructure operator. This restructuring will also allow other rail operators to run trains on TCDD tracks by means of track access charges, and will end the monopoly of TCDD.

The new law about liberalization of Turkish railway transportation is accepted by Turkish Parliament and approved by the President of Turkey in April 2013. According to the law, TCDD will stay as the owner of infrastructure and the new company TCDD Taşımacılık AŞ will be operating the trains. Private companies will soon be allowed to run on TCDD infrastructure as well as the new infrastructure owned by private companies if
constructed.
There are also some commuter rail projects like Marmaray and Başkentray.

Network

In 2022, Turkey had  of railway lines, of which 95% were single-tracked, 21% of the network was electrified and 28% signalled. Due to the mountainous geography of the country, the network has many steep gradients and sharp curves. The Turkish rail network does not cover all major cities; its fourth and fifth largest metropolitan areas of Bursa and Antalya respectively remain unconnected to the network, although plans exist for high-speed rail lines to reach them.

Electrified lines run from Kapıkule on the Bulgarian border via Istanbul to Ankara, and from Divriği via Malatya to İskenderun on the Mediterranean coast. Additionally, Sivas and İzmir have electrified networks.
Here are some technical informations (standards) about the Turkish railway system:
 Rail Gauge – 
 Electrification – 25 kV, 50 Hz AC Overhead lines
 Loading gauge – UIC GC
 Traffic – Right-Hand traffic
 Rail – S49 (Old) and UIC 60 (New, Rebuilt and High-speed lines)
 Sleepers – Wooden & Steel (Old) and Concrete (New, Rebuilt and High-speed lines)
 Fastening – Baseplate based with Screw spikes (Old) and Tension Clamp (New, Rebuilt and High-speed lines)
 Coupling – Buffers and Chains (Locomotives and Passenger cars) and Scharfenberg (MUs)
 Brake – Air

High-speed rail lines

The first completed section of the high-speed rail line between Ankara and Eskişehir was opened by the Prime Minister Recep Tayyip Erdoğan on 13 March 2009.

As of May 2016, there are four high-speed routes (Istanbul-Ankara, Istanbul-Konya, Ankara-Eskisehir, Ankara-Konya) running on two different high-speed railway lines. Bursa, Sivas and Izmir are among some of other cities to be connected to the high-speed network with works being underway. Bursa will be connected to the Ankara-Istanbul high-speed railway, a new line is currently being constructed from Ankara to Sivas and another new line from Polatlı to İzmir via Afyon is also under construction.

Lines are also planned from Yerköy (on the line from Ankara to Sivas) to Kayseri and another one from Halkalı to Edirne on Turkey's European border with Bulgaria.

Passenger transport
In addition to high speed lines, there are several regular trains for passenger transportation. Almost all the network is covered by these passenger trains, which are mostly departing every day. In addition to high speed trains, there are several types of wagons being used for railway transport like pulman, sleeping cars, couchette, dmu and emu sets. In 2019, 164.7 million passengers used the Turkish rail network.

As of May 2016, there are several construction points (mainly for signalization or electrification) in Turkish rail network which is causing complete or partial closures.

Railway links with adjacent countries

West neighboring countries
  Bulgaria – open  –  – 25 kV, 50 Hz AC
  Greece – open  –  – 25 kV, 50 Hz AC (but no trains running since February 2011 due to economic crisis in Greece)

East neighboring countries
  Georgia – open – break-of-gauge / at Akhalkalaki (Georgia)
  Armenia – closed – break-of-gauge / (see the Kars-Gyumri-Tbilisi railway line)
  Azerbaijan – no direct link – break-of-gauge / via Georgia (see the Kars-Gyumri-Tbilisi railway line), via Iran (toward Nakhchivan Autonomous Republic).
  Iran – via Lake Van train ferry –

South neighboring countries
  Iraq – no direct link, traffic routed via Syria – 
  Syria – closed because of the Syrian civil war – 

Trains to Iraq must be routed via Syria; the section of the tracks within Syria, between the Turkish and Iraqi borders is 81 km long. From 5 March 2012 due to the civil war in Syria, all rail services from Turkey to Syria were stopped; as a consequence freight going from Turkey to Iraq was routed to Nusaybin in southeast Turkey, from where it was transported to Iraq by truck.

The Iranian rail network is connected to the Turkish rail network via the Lake Van train ferry close to the border – which creates a serious bottleneck. In 2007 an agreement was made to create a rail link between the two countries.

The construction of the line is planned to be completed by 2014 and has a target of transporting 17 million tons of cargo per year. This railway by-passes the Kars–Gyumri–Tbilisi railway line that connected Turkey to Armenia which was closed in 1993 during the First Nagorno-Karabakh War; in 2009 the possibility of re-opening the line was stated by the Armenian transport minister.

Urban rail

Commuter
Suburban systems in Turkey as listed below:

Metro/LRT
Six cities in Turkey have Metro/LRT system, listed as follows:

A further two metro systems are planned in Mersin and Gebze.

Tram
There are also several tram systems in many cities, listed as follows:

Nostalgic tramway

Companies

Turkish State Railways

In combination with its affiliates, the State Railways of the Republic of Turkey (Türkiye Cumhuriyeti Devlet Demiryolları, TCDD) have a monopoly on passenger and freight rail transportation, as well as the manufacturing of rolling stock and tracks. The organization was created in 1927 to operate the former railway lines of the Ottoman Empire that were left within the borders of the Republic of Turkey whose boundaries were defined with the Treaty of Lausanne in 1923. Additionally, major ports are also operated by the company.

Affiliated companies
Three affiliated companies of the TCDD produce rolling stock for the Turkish railway system: 
TÜLOMSAŞ (Türkiye Lokomotif ve Motor Sanayi A.Ş.) produces diesel and electric locomotives and related components; the company has produced locomotives under license from numerous companies over the years, including Krauss-Maffei, GM-EMD, Toshiba and Alstom.
TÜVASAŞ (Türkiye Vagon Sanayi A.Ş.) manufactures coaching stock as well as diesel hydraulic railcars, and has a technology transfer agreement with Rotem of Korea to manufacture DMUs as well as a joint venture with Rotem, EUROTEM, to outfit and test high-speed train sets and suburban trains.<ref>İlk hızlı tren fabrikası üretime başlıyor  Plant begins production of the first high speed train, October 2008, www.tumgazeteler.com</ref>
TÜDEMSAŞ (Türkiye Demiryolu Makinaları Sanayii A.Ş.'') produces and repairs freight wagons.

Statistical information

In 2008, the most common rail weight is ~49 kg/m with 69% of track, the remainder being of lighter weight rail, except for 150 km of 60 kg/m rail. Similarly, 69% of sleepers are of the concrete type, with the remainder being wood (~19%) and steel (~12%). Over 700 tunnels exist, with a total length of 181 km; the majority (~76%) are under 1 km long and only one of them has a length of over 4 km. 1,316 steel bridges (average length 22 m) and over 10,000 concrete bridges (average length 2.9 m) exist, the majority (99%) are suitable for axle loads over 20 t, with 40% allowing axle loads of 22.5 tonnes.

Also in 2008, there were 64 electric locomotives and 549 diesel locomotives in Turkey, with availabilities of 81 and 84 percent, respectively. Additionally, 50 steam locomotives exist, of which 2 are kept in active order. In addition to the 83 EMUs and 44 DMUs for passenger transport, there were 995 coaches in Turkey (830 of which were in working order.) Over 17,000 wagons of various types make up the rest of the fleet.

Rail gauge in Turkey
All high-speed and main rail lines use standard-gauge railway with the exception of the Bursa and Istanbul nostalgic tramways, which use the metre-gauge railway.

See also

Çamlık Railway Museum
TCDD Open Air Steam Locomotive Museum
Istanbul Railway Museum
Rahmi M. Koç Museum

References and notes

Notes

References

External links